= Saudi Society of Dermatology and Dermatologic Surgery =

- Abbreviation: SSDDS
- Formation: 1989
- Type: Scientific Society (non-profit)
- Location: Riyadh, Saudi Arabia
- Region served: Saudi
- President: Dr. Abdullah Sulaiman Alakeel
- Main organ: Skin and its Diseases
- Website: www.ssdds.org

The Saudi Society of Dermatology and Dermatologic Surgery (in Arabic الجمعية السعودية لأمراض وجراحة الجلد), commonly abbreviated as SSDDS, (formerly The Saudi Society of Dermatology and Venereology), is a scientific organization that was established in 1989.

Dr. Sami Al Sogair has been attributed to the foundation of the society, who also stands as its president since 1989 until 1994.

In 1994, an SSDDS election installed Dr Omar AlSheikh as president, succeeded by Ali Alraddadi and then Dr Sami Alsuwaidan. Dr. Abdullah Sulaiman Alakeel is the current president of the society.

== Activities ==
The 13th National Symposium of the SSDDS was held on 30–31 December 2009.
